Aşağı Qolqəti (also, Ashaga Kolgaty and Ashagy Kolgaty) is a village in the Agdash Rayon of Azerbaijan.

References 

Populated places in Agdash District